Weel is a hamlet in the East Riding of Yorkshire, England. It lies on the east bank of the River Hull.

It forms part of the civil parish of Tickton.

Telephone services are provided by KCOM and in 2013 a superfast fibre optic broadband service was made available.

References

External links

Villages in the East Riding of Yorkshire